Anzan-e Gharbi Rural District is a rural district (dehestan) in the Central District of Bandar-e Gaz County, Golestan Province, Iran. At the 2006 census, its population was 6,022, in 1,542 families.  The rural district has 8 villages.

References 

Rural Districts of Golestan Province
Bandar-e Gaz County